Below is a list of Catholic Chaplaincies in England and Wales:

Latin-rite Catholic Chaplaincies

Airport Chaplaincies 
Birmingham Airport Chaplaincy
Gatwick Airport Chaplaincy
Heathrow Airport Chaplaincy
Manchester Airport Chaplaincy
Stansted Airport Chaplaincy

Armed Forces Chaplaincies 
Bishopric of the Forces

Chaplains to Foreign Communities (CECs) 
African Chaplaincy
Asian Chaplaincy
Austrian Chaplaincy
Chinese Chaplaincy
Croatian Chaplaincy
Czech Chaplaincy
Filipino Chaplaincy
French parish
German Chaplaincy
Ghanaian Chaplaincy
Hungarian Chaplaincy
Irish Chaplaincy
Italian Chaplaincy
Latin American Chaplaincy
Lithuanian Chaplaincy
Maltese Chaplaincy
Polish Catholic Mission
Portuguese Chaplaincy
Slovenian Chaplaincy
Spanish Chaplaincy
Tamil Chaplaincy
Vietnamese Chaplaincy
West Indian Chaplaincy

Higher Education Chaplaincies 
There is an extensive network of Catholic Chaplains and Chaplaincies in Higher Education in the UK.  For more information see the website of the Conference of Catholic Chaplains in HE at http://www.ccche.org.uk/h

Hospital Chaplaincies

Port Chaplaincies 

Apostleship of the Sea (Stella Maris)

Prison Chaplaincies

School and College Chaplaincies

Eastern-rite Catholic Chaplaincies

Chaplains to Ethnic Communities (CECs) 
Chaldean Chaplaincy
Maronite Chaplaincy
Melkite Chaplaincy

Apostolic Exarchate 
Apostolic Exarchate for Ukrainians

References 

Chaplains
Catholic Church in England and Wales